Philip Colbert is a British artist. Colbert works across the mediums of painting, sculpture, clothing, furniture and design. Colbert was described by Andre Leon Talley as "The godson of Andy Warhol".<ref>[http://www.heraldscotland.com/fashion/bloggers/new-collections-the-rodnik-band.1392203526 Herald Scotland']</ref> i-D magazine referred to Colbert as "the crown prince of pop art".

In April 2022 he launched a wide scale NFT project titled The Lobstars, consisting of 7,777 JPEGs of various lobsters. 

Early life and education
Colbert was educated at Strathallan School, and the University of St Andrews. He graduated with an MA in philosophy.

Career
Colbert's paintings follow from a dialogue established by pop painters Richard Hamilton, James Rosenquist and Roy Litchenstien. Colbert's works involve appropriation.  Colbert refers to his alter ego as "a cartoon contemporary protagonist of surrealism". Colbert's paintings bring together old master influences from Rubens to Van Dyck and his obsession with everyday consumer imagery and the saturation of digital media.

Colbert's sculptural work includes wearable artworks, such as the "Urinal Dress, Meat Dress & Washing Machine Dress ".

In September 2015 Colbert designed range of clothing as merchandise for The World Goes Pop'' exhibition Tate Modern. Colbert had his first large scale paintings show at Saatchi Gallery.

In 2017, the show featured Colbert's large scale pop narrative paintings featuring his Lobster Alter ego.

"We live in a world of ultra pop saturation, a sort of mega pop world where mass intake of Instagram and social media imagery merges with artistic memory," says Colbert.
In 2018 Colbert launched the Popcorn Group to produce feature films and theatre.

Exhibitions
2014 – Sequin Pop, Gazelli Art House, London, UK
2015 – Het Noordbrabants Museum, Holland 
2015 – Inspired, Van Gogh Museum, Holland
2016 – Guess Who?, Gazelli Art House, London, UK
2016 – Fried Egg World, Art16, London, UK
2016 – Guess who? Space Gallery, St. Barth 
2017 – New Paintings, Saatchi Gallery, London, UK

Personal life
Philip Colbert is married to artist and screenwriter Charlotte Colbert.

See also
Peter Saul
Sonia Delaunay
Keith Haring
Franco Moschino
Nimrod Kamer

References

External links
 Rodnik on Teen Vogue
 Fashionindie on Rodnik
 Official site
 Rodnik Band
 Style.com Alain de Botton – Colbert video

Scottish fashion designers
Living people
People educated at Strathallan School
Alumni of the University of St Andrews
Year of birth missing (living people)